Colón District  is a district (distrito) of Colón Province in Panama. The population according to the 2000 census was 174,059; the latest official estimate (for 2019) is 253,366. The district covers a total area of 1,180 km². The capital lies at the city of Colón City.

Administrative divisions
Colón District is divided administratively into the following corregimientos:

Barrio Norte1
Barrio Sur1
Buena Vista
Cativá
Ciricito
Sabanitas
Salamanca
Limón
Nueva Providencia
Puerto Pilón
Cristóbal
Escobal
San Juan
Santa Rosa

1 - These corregimientos represent as Colón City, the capital of the district.

References 

Districts of Colón Province